Thomas Francis "Chick" Farr (19 February 1914 – 15 June 1980) was a professional footballer who played as a goalkeeper for Blackburn Athletic and Bradford Park Avenue.

References
Sources
All About Avenue, Malcolm Hartley & Tim Clapham (2004) Tony Brown Soccer Data Publication, Nottingham
Why Today's Footballers are Faceless, Michael Parkinson, c1967, Sunday Times
Football Daft, Michael Parkinson, (1968) Stanley Paul & Co Ltd, London.

External links

1914 births
1980 deaths
Scottish footballers
Association football goalkeepers
English Football League players
Bradford (Park Avenue) A.F.C. players
Huddersfield Town A.F.C. wartime guest players
People from Bathgate
Footballers from West Lothian